Corpse Love: The First Year  is an anthology by American noise rock band Pussy Galore, released on February 14, 1992 by Caroline Records. It comprises the band's first three EPs with several tracks from Exile on Main St and unreleased songs.

Track listing

Release history

References

External links 
 Corpse Love: The First Year at Discogs (list of releases)

1992 compilation albums
Pussy Galore (band) albums
Caroline Records compilation albums